Fuka, Fūka or Fuuka may refer to:

Fūka (given name), a feminine Japanese given name
Fuuka (manga), a Japanese manga series
Fukah, a village in northern Egypt, referred to as Fuka in a World War II context
Sidi Haneish Airfield, referred to as Fuka Aerodrome in World War II

People with the surname
Eva Fuka, American photographer
František Fuka, computer programmer and musician